Lee Academy is a private boarding and day high school in Lee, Maine, United States, founded in 1845 as a teacher training school, and now serving grades 9–12.

Overseas expansion
In 2005, Lee Academy signed an agreement with officials in the People's Republic of China to establish the first American-style high school in China. The agreement called for schools to be established in Shenzhen, Shijiazhuang and Chengdu.

In September 2009, the Shenzhen American International School, a satellite school of Lee Academy, opened in Shenzhen, China. It had a principal from Orono, Maine and five teachers.

Lee Academy operates Daegu International School, Daegu, Korea in a partnership with the City of Daegu.  Daegu International School is a K - 12 High School servicing 317 International and Korean Students.  

In more recent years Lee Academy has expanded further into China opening a Fine Arts Specialty High School in Shanghai, China.  American Lee Academy International School - Shanghai is a four-year college preparatory high school providing students in Shanghai, China with a US high school education with concentrations in animation, art, music, dance and theater.  Lee Academy also has a 3 + 0 partnership with Lishui Foreign Language International School in Lishui, China.  The Lishui program has Lee Academy staff stationed at the school in China where students take Lee Academy courses.  A summer program on the Lee Academy campus in Lee, Maine is also a requirement of the program.

Faculty & staff
As of September 2015, Lee academy has 39 faculty and Staff members, 23 of which are teachers.

Student body
As of September 2016, Lee Academy has 82 international students, 135 local students, making 217 overall.  Lee Academy has a diverse student body with students from twenty-six countries and sixteen Maine communities.

Extracurricular activities
As of 2015, Lee Academy offers seasonal sports. The fall sports at Lee Academy are Soccer, Cross Country, and Volleyball. The winter sports are Basketball, Cheering and Skiing. The spring sports are Baseball, Softball, and Tennis. Lee Academy offers a fall musical. In March the French club goes to Quebec City. Lee Academy also has of variety of other activities including Math team, photography club, ethnic cooking, and Entropy, to name a few.  Most recently, the Academy has offered an Outing Club to students providing an opportunity to explore and enjoy the great Maine outdoors.

Lee Academy has an annual Lee Academy Sports Hall of Fame celebrate to recognize outstanding alumni who have distinguished themselves as significant contributors to Lee Academy athletic teams.

The Arts are a focus of the additional offerings as Lee Academy.  The Academy has been a perennial top performer in the One Act competition through the Maine Principals' Association.  Concert and Jazz Band are both important and strong components of the fine arts offerings at Lee Academy.  The Academy has Studio Arts and Digital Photography offerings as part of the arts offerings.  Each year Lee Academy sponsors a celebration of the arts through All for the Arts night.

Lee Academy has a successful Post Graduate Basketball team which fields both an A and B team which compete in the NEPSEC athletic conference.

Notable people
 Everett McLeod, State Representative and Trustee

References

Private high schools in Maine
Schools in Penobscot County, Maine
 
Educational institutions established in 1845
1845 establishments in Maine